Step on It! is a lost 1922 American silent Western film directed by Jack Conway and featuring Hoot Gibson, released by Universal Pictures.

Plot
As described in a film magazine, Vic Collins (Gibson) is continually losing cattle, but is unable to trace them beyond a stream that skirts his ranch. Lafe Brownell (Girard), an officer from Texas sent to trace cattle thieves, tells Vic that the new telegraph operator Lorraine Leighton (Bedford), whom Vic has become interested in, is at the bottom of the thefts. Vic follows her to a nearby ranch and finds the bed of the stream dry, because the water has been shutoff at a sluice way. Thus, his cattle had been driven across the dry stream and then the water turned on again. Vic is captured by the thieves and threatened with death, but Lorraine rides back to his ranch for help. It turns out that she was mingled with the gang only to obtain evidence to clear her brother's name from falsely being jailed for murder.

Cast
 Hoot Gibson as Vic Collins
 Edith Yorke as Mrs Collins
 Frank Lanning as Pidge Walters
 Barbara Bedford as Lorraine Leighton
 Victor Potel as Noisy Johnson
 Gloria Davenport as Letty Mather
 Joseph W. Girard as Lafe Brownell (credited as Joe Girard)
 Lee Shumway as Bowman (credited as L.C. Shumway)

See also
 Hoot Gibson filmography

References

External links

 
 

1922 films
1922 lost films
1922 Western (genre) films
American black-and-white films
Films directed by Jack Conway
Lost Western (genre) films
Lost American films
Silent American Western (genre) films
Universal Pictures films
1920s American films